Negrea is a genus of beetles in the family Carabidae, containing the following species:

 Negrea aldretei Mateu, 1982 
 Negrea chiapanensis Mateu, 1975 
 Negrea freyi Mateu, 1972 
 Negrea immaculata Mateu, 1975 
 Negrea mexicana Mateu, 1975 
 Negrea opaca Mateu, 1982 
 Negrea peruviana Mateu, 1982 
 Negrea scutellaris (Dejean, 1834) 
 Negrea striatella Mateu, 1982

References

Lebiinae
Carabidae genera